A partial listing of recording artists who formerly recorded for Victor Talking Machine Company (known in most of the world as Victor Records prior to 1946) include the following list. Included are artists on Victor's subsidiary label, Bluebird Records.

Please make a note if recordings were only leased from another label, this page should basically only list recording artists.

A
Irving Aaronson and his Commanders
Abbott & Costello
Louis Armstrong
Gene Autry

B
Count Basie
Samuel Barber
Leonard Bernstein
Benson Orchestra of Chicago
Jimmy Blanton
Ishmon Bracey
Delmore Brothers
Richard "Rabbit" Brown
Barney Bigard
Leon "Chu" Berry
Sidney Bechet
Big Bill Broonzy
Bix Beiderbecke
Boston Symphony Orchestra
Six Brown Brothers
Scrapper Blackwell

C
The Carolina Tar Heels
Harry Carney
Hoagy Carmichael
Enrico Caruso
Fiddlin' John Carson
Arthur "Big Boy" Crudup
Bing Crosby
Blanche Calloway
Cab Calloway
Blind Clyde Church - blues musician
Leroy Carr
Bo Carter
Carter Family
Wilf Carter
Charlie Christian
Nat King Cole (as the King Cole Trio)
Cozy Cole
George M. Cohan
Joan Crawford
Giuseppe Creatore
Perry Como
Eddie Condon
Arthur Collins (singer)
Russ Colombo
Xavier Cugat

D
Vernon Dalhart
Julius Daniels
Walter Davis
The Delmore Brothers
Jimmy Dorsey
Tommy Dorsey
Disney Film Soundtracks - Snow White and the Seven Dwarfs, Pinocchio, Dumbo, Bambi
Marguerite Dunlap

E
Sleepy John Estes
Harry "Sweets" Edison
Duke Ellington

F
Geraldine Farrar
Ella Fitzgerald

G
George Gershwin
Alma Gluck
Dizzy Gillespie
Benny Goodman
Jean Goldkette
Lil Green
Stéphane Grappelli
Freddie Green
Woody Guthrie

H
Adelaide Hall
Lionel Hampton
Morton Harvey
Coleman Hawkins
Fletcher Henderson
Earl "Fatha" Hines
Dan Hornsby
Johnny Hodges
Lena Horne
Alberta Hunter
Billie Holiday

I
The Ink Spots

J
Harry James
Charley Jordan
Luke Jordan
Lonnie Johnson
James P. Johnson
Tommy Johnson

K
Roger Wolfe Kahn
Barney Kessel
Gene Krupa

L
Eddie Lang
Harry Lauder
Lead Belly
Furry Lewis
Charles Lindbergh
Little Mix

M
Christie MacDonald
Uncle Dave Macon
Tommy McClennan
Harry McClintock
John McCormack
McKinney's Cotton Pickers
Memphis Jug Band
Memphis Minnie
Carmen Miranda
Big Maceo
Hal Mcintyre
Blind Willie McTell
Bill Monroe
Jelly Roll Morton
Oscar Moore
Vaughn Monroe
Bennie Moten
Billy Murray
Moonshine Kate
Glenn Miller

N
Ray Noble
Sonny Boy Nelson
Tricky Sam Nanton

O
King Oliver
Original Dixieland Jazz Band
Eugene Ormandy

P
Oran "Hot Lips" Page
Walter Page
Cole Porter
Ignacy Jan Paderewski
Oscar Peterson
Paul Whiteman and His Orchestra

R
Yank Rachell
Sergei Rachmaninoff
Buddy Rich
Django Reinhardt
Carson Robison
Paul Robeson
Jimmie Rodgers
Roy Rogers
Jimmy Rushing

S
Artie Shaw
Nathaniel Shilkret
Dinah Shore
Frank Sinatra
Mamie Smith
John Philip Sousa
Frank Stokes
Hank Snow
Pinetop Sparks
Roosevelt Sykes recorded as Willie Kelly
Roy Smeck
Pablo de Sarasate

T
Tampa Red
Jack Teagarden
Arturo Toscanini
Frankie Trumbauer
Bessie Tucker
Ernest Tubb

V
Joe Venuti
Victor Military Band
Victor Orchestra

W
Fats Waller
Washboard Sam
Paul Whiteman
Peetie Wheatstraw
Henry Whitter
Ben Webster
Fess Williams and his Royal Flush Orchestra
Bukka White - recorded as Washington White
Cootie Williams
Big Joe Williams
Sonny Boy Williamson I
Ted Weems
Casey Bill Weldon recorded as Will Weldon

U.S. Presidents
Theodore Roosevelt
William Howard Taft
Woodrow Wilson
Warren G. Harding 
Calvin Coolidge
Herbert Hoover
Franklin D. Roosevelt

See also 
 Victor Talking Machine Company

References

Lists of recording artists by label